Fascism: A Warning is a 2018 book about fascism by Madeleine Albright, published by HarperCollins.

References

External links
Interview at the National Book Festival with Albright on Fascism, September 1, 2018

2018 non-fiction books
Anti-fascism in the United States
Books about fascism
Books by Madeleine Albright
HarperCollins books